Lucky Me! is a Philippine instant noodle brand introduced in 1989 by Monde Nissin.

History 
In November 1989, Monde Nissin entered the instant noodle segment with Lucky Me!. It launched Instant Mami, noodle with soup in pouches, in Beef and Chicken variants. Eventually, these became the fastest-selling products like beef and chicken flavor. 1991 saw the introduction of Lucky Me! Pancit Canton, the first dry stir-fry pouched noodles in the Philippine market. It was then followed in 1995 by Lucky Me! Supreme in La Paz Batchoy flavor, marketed as the first Filipino dish-flavored no-cook cup noodles, and Lucky Me! Special in 2009, which consists of noodles based on local and international flavors such as Lomi (egg noodles in seafood flavor), Jjamppong (spicy Korean noodles), Curly Spaghetti, Baked Mac, Mac & Cheez, and Cheese Ramyun.

Kantar Worldpanel cited Lucky Me! in their 2014 Brand Footprint Report as the most chosen and purchased consumer brand in the Philippines, reaching almost all Filipino households.

On July 8, 2022, numerous countries issued a health warning regarding Lucky Me! products due to the reported presence of ethylene oxide, although Monde Nissin denied the claims, stating that the products are FDA registered and comply with food safety standards.

Lucky Me Products

Lucky Me Instant Mami
Chicken 
Beef

Lucky Me Spicy Hot Mami
Spicy Chicken
Spicy Beef
Spicy Pork

Lucky Me Pancit Canton

Current flavors
Original (introduced in 1991)
Calamansi (introduced in 1999)
Hot Chili (introduced in 2000)
Chilimansi (introduced in 2001)
Sweet & Spicy (introduced in 2007)

Former flavors
Adobo (introduced in early 2000s, discontinued in 2007)
Garlic and Shrimp (introduced in early 2000s, discontinued in 2007)
Grilled spareribs (introduced in early 2000s, discontinued in 2007)

Lucky Me Go Cup (formerly Lucky Me Supreme)
Chicken Mami
Beef Mami
Chicken Sotanghon
La Paz Batchoy
Bulalo
Lomi
Spicy La Paz Batchoy
Spicy Bulalo
Jjamppong
Seafood
Hot Cheese Ramyun
Pancit Canton Calamansi
Pancit Canton Hot Chili
Pancit Canton Chilimansi

Lucky Me Pouches (formerly Lucky Me Special)
Itnok (Chicken & Egg)
La Paz Batchoy
Bulalo
Curly Spaghetti
Baked Mac
Mac and Cheese
Lomi
Jjamppong

References 

Instant noodle brands
Food brands of the Philippines
Products introduced in 1989